Indiana station is an at-grade light rail station on the L Line of the Los Angeles Metro Rail system. It is located alongside South Indiana Street (the station's namesake) as the line transitions between 1st Street and 3rd Street on the eastern edge of the Boyle Heights neighborhood of Los Angeles. This station opened in 2009 as part of the Gold Line Eastside Extension. This station and all the other Eastside Extension stations will be part of the E Line upon completion of the Regional Connector project in 2023.

Service

Station layout 
Indiana station utilizes a simple island platform setup with two tracks in an exclusive right-of-way, located east of South Indiana Street. There are two ramps for platform access, one at the intersection with Gleason Avenue, which connections to the station's park and ride lot, and the other at the intersection with East 3rd Street.

Hours and frequency

Connections 
, the following connections are available:
El Sol: Whittier Blvd/Saybrook Park
LADOT DASH: Boyle Heights/East LA
Montebello Transit: 40

References

External links 

L Line (Los Angeles Metro) stations
Eastside Los Angeles
Railway stations in the United States opened in 2009
2009 establishments in California